Mountain Spring may mean:

A Spring
 Mountain Spring (Imperial County, California)

A Locale 
 Mountain Spring, San Diego County, California a locale in San Diego County.

A Former Populated Place
 Enterprise, Butte County, California, also known as Mountain Spring, now inundated by Lake Oroville.

See also
 Mountain Springs (disambiguation)